Kiryat Haim railway station (Tahanat HaRakevet Kiryat Haim) is an Israel Railways passenger station serving Haifa's borough of Kiryat Haim and its immediate surrounding region.

Location

The station is situated on the north–south coastal line and is located on Brodetsky Street (Rekhov Brodetski) in the central part of the town, on the administrative border between Eastern and Western Kiryat Haim. The station is one of two railway stations serving Haifa's northern suburbs – the Krayot (the other being Kiryat Motzkin railway station), although it is slightly smaller in terms of passenger numbers and trains serving it. The station is also one of six railway stations within Haifa's municipal borders.

History

The present-day station stands on the spot of a halt that existed as early as the 1930s on the Beirut–Cairo railway, constructed by the British during their Mandate for Palestine, connecting Kiryat Haim's residential areas with Haifa's sea port, the main employer of the residents at that time.

Until the mid-1990s a small shed was the only structure marking the station. At that time a station was constructed according to the present passenger station format of Israel Railways. The station now consists of two platforms with two parallel rail tracks running between them, a pedestrian tunnel connecting the two platforms and a small station building on the eastern side (Kiryat Haim Mizrahit (Eastern) exit) as well as an exit on the west side (Kiryat Haim Ma'aravit (Western) exit).

In the early 2000s a tunnel was constructed directly beneath the station's platforms replaced the dangerous level crossing that existed just north of the station.

During the 2006 Israel-Lebanon conflict train service to the station was suspended after a Hezbollah Katyusha rocket hit a train depot in Haifa on July 16, 2006, killing 8 Israel Railways workers. It was restored 29 days later, on August 14, two days after the ceasefire went into effect.

Train service

Kiryat Haim is a station on both the main north–south coastal line of Israel Railways (Nahariya–Haifa–Tel Aviv–Ben Gurion Airport–Be'er Sheva Inter-City Service) and the suburban line serving Haifa's northern suburbs – The Kerayot (Haifa–Kiryat Motzkin Suburban Service).  The station is situated between Kiryat Motzkin railway station to the north and Hutzot HaMifratz railway station to the south.

Station layout
Platform numbers increase in an East-to-West direction

Ridership

Public transport connections

Kiryat Haim railway station is located about 1.5 km the west of the main highway ( Highway 4) and thus is out of walking distance from a large number of bus lines. Two Egged bus lines, routes 13 and 26, have a stop in the entrance to the tunnel beneath the station, both running at about 20 minute intervals.

References

External links 
Israel Railways website

Railway stations in Haifa
Railway station